Louis Sarowksy, also known as Lurker Lou, is a goofy footed American skateboarder and artist from Dennis Port, Cape Cod, Massachusetts.

Skateboarding 
Lurker Lou Sarowksy is known for skating unique and difficult spots.

Art 
Sarowksy is an artist who often uses recycled materials in his sculptural practice including skateboard decks and other used skateboarding related materials. In 2019–2020, Sarowksy was awarded a residency at the Gowanus E-Waste Warehouse where he used the recycled electronic waste the center collects in his artwork, making sculptures and doing performances, often involving skateboarding and skateboarding materials.

References

External links 

 Lurker Lou and the Purple Shoe
 An Interview With Lurker Lou - Quartersnacks

American skateboarders
People from Dennis, Massachusetts
Sportspeople from Barnstable County, Massachusetts
Recycled art artists
Artist skateboarders